Pygophora may refer to:

 Pygophora (crustacean), an order of crustaceans
 Pygophora (fly), a genus of flies in the family Muscidae

See also
 Pygophorinia